The 2014 women's road cycling season was the fourth for the Team Giant–Shimano (UCI code: GIW), which began as Team Skil–Argos in 2010.

Roster

Riders who joined the team for the 2014 season

Riders who left the team during or after the 2013 season

Season victories

Results in major races

Single day races

Grand Tours

UCI World Ranking

The 2014 UCI Women's Road Rankings are rankings based upon the results in all UCI-sanctioned races of the 2014 women's road cycling season.

Team Giant–Shimano finished fifth in the 2014 ranking for UCI teams.

References

2014 UCI Women's Teams seasons
2014 in Dutch sport
2014